Ahmad Masjed-Jamei is an Iranian reformist politician and academic who was chairman of City Council of Tehran from 3 September 2013 until 3 September 2014. He served as Culture Minister under President Mohammad Khatami from 2000 to 2005. He was elected a Tehran City Councillor in 2006 and was reelected in 2013.

Career

Culture Minister
Jamei became culture minister when Khatami's first minister, Ata'ollah Mohajerani, was forced to resign following criticism by conservatives for "eroding moral standards". Jamei previously served as deputy culture minister.

As culture minister he promoted freedom of the press, saying it helps to prevent the accumulation of "negative anxieties" in society. However his efforts were undermined by the judiciary which was controlled by the Supreme Leader, Ali Khamenei, which ordered the closure of over 100 newspapers during Jamei's tenure as culture minister Jamei protested against the closure of newspapers and arrest of journalists without effect.

Dialogue among civilizations
Following the election Mahmoud Ahmadinejad as president in the Iranian presidential election of 2005, Jamei was appointed managing director of the International Center for Dialogue Among Civilizations, an organization founded by Khatami.

Election as City Council chairman
After 2013 local election, he was nominated as chairman of City Council of Tehran by Reformists. Mohsen Hashemi Rafsanjani was also Reformists' nominee for Mayor of Tehran. On 3 September 2013, Masjed-Jamei was elected as chairman by 16 out of 31 votes and succeeded Mehdi Chamran in the post.

References

Living people
People from Tehran
Government ministers of Iran
Iranian reformists
Chairmen of City Council of Tehran
Presidential advisers of Iran
Tehran Councillors 2017–
Tehran Councillors 2013–2017
Tehran Councillors 2007–2013
Recipients of the Order of Culture and Art
1956 births
University of Tehran alumni